Gustav Adolph Anderson (August 7, 1893 – April 7, 1983) was an American farmer and politician.

Anderson was born in Stevens County, Minnesota. He served in the United States Army during World War I. Anderson lived in Morris, Minnesota with his wife and family and was a grain and stock farmer. Anderson served in the Minnesota House of Representatives from 1953 to 1956 and was a Democrat.

References

1893 births
1983 deaths
People from Morris, Minnesota
Military personnel from Minnesota
Farmers from Minnesota
Democratic Party members of the Minnesota House of Representatives